Nervi is a district of Genoa, Italy

Nervi may also refer to:

 Mauro Nervi, an Italian poet in the Esperanto language
 Pier Luigi Nervi, an Italian engineer and architect.

See also 
 Nerva  (disambiguation)
 Nervii, a Celtic or Germanic tribe of Roman times.
 Nervo (disambiguation)